In computer science and discrete mathematics, an inversion in a sequence is a pair of elements that are out of their natural order.

Definitions

Inversion

Let  be a permutation.  
The inversion is indicated by an ordered pair containing either the places  or the elements .

The inversion set is the set of all inversions.  A permutation's inversion set using place-based notation is the same as the inverse permutation's inversion set using element-based notation with the two components of each ordered pair exchanged.  Likewise, a permutation's inversion set using element-based notation is the same as the inverse permutation's inversion set using place-based notation with the two components of each ordered pair exchanged. 

Inversions are usually defined for permutations, but may also be defined for sequences:Let  be a sequence (or multiset permutation).

For sequences, inversions according to the element-based definition are not unique, because different pairs of places may have the same pair of values.

Inversion number

The inversion number  of a sequence ,  is the cardinality of the inversion set. It is a common measure of sortedness (sometimes called presortedness) of a permutation or sequence. The inversion number is between 0 and  inclusive.  A permutation and its inverse have the same inversion number.

For example  since the sequence is ordered. Also, when  is even,  (because each pair  is an inversion). This last example shows that a set that is intuitively "nearly sorted" can still have a quadratic number of inversions.

The inversion number is the number of crossings in the arrow diagram of the permutation, the permutation's Kendall tau distance from the identity permutation, and the sum of each of the inversion related vectors defined below.

Other measures of sortedness include the minimum number of elements that can be deleted from the sequence to yield a fully sorted sequence, the number and lengths of sorted "runs" within the sequence, the Spearman footrule (sum of distances of each element from its sorted position), and the smallest number of exchanges needed to sort the sequence. Standard comparison sorting algorithms can be adapted to compute the inversion number in time .

Inversion related vectors

Three similar vectors are in use that condense the inversions of a permutation into a vector that uniquely determines it. They are often called inversion vector or Lehmer code. (A list of sources is found here.)

This article uses the term inversion vector like Wolfram. The remaining two vectors are sometimes called left and right inversion vector, but to avoid confusion with the inversion vector this article calls them  left inversion count and right inversion count. Interpreted as a factorial number the left inversion count gives the permutations reverse colexicographic, and the right inversion count gives the lexicographic index.

 is the number of elements in  greater than  before .

 is the number of elements in  greater than  before .

 is the number of elements in  smaller than  after .

Both  and  can be found with the help of a Rothe diagram, which is a permutation matrix with the 1s represented by dots, and an inversion (often represented by a cross) in every position that has a dot to the right and below it.  is the sum of inversions in row  of the Rothe diagram, while  is the sum of inversions in column .

Example: All permutations of four elements

(The columns with smaller print and no heading are reflections of the columns next to them, and can be used to sort them in colexicographic order.)

(Pairs in descending diagonals have the right components 2, 3, 4 in common, while pairs in ascending diagonals have the left components 1, 2, 3 in common.)

Weak order of permutations

The set of permutations on n items can be given the structure of a partial order, called the weak order of permutations, which forms a lattice.

The Hasse diagram of the inversion sets ordered by the subset relation forms the skeleton of a permutohedron.

If a permutation is assigned to each inversion set using the place-based definition, the resulting order of permutations is that of the permutohedron, where an edge corresponds to the swapping of two elements with consecutive values. This is the weak order of permutations. The identity is its minimum, and the permutation formed by reversing the identity is its maximum.

If a permutation were assigned to each inversion set using the element-based definition, the resulting order of permutations would be that of a Cayley graph, where an edge corresponds to the swapping of two elements on consecutive places. This Cayley graph of the symmetric group is similar to its permutohedron, but with each permutation replaced by its inverse.

See also 

 Factorial number system
 Permutation graph
 Transpositions, simple transpositions, inversions and sorting
 Damerau–Levenshtein distance
 Parity of a permutation

Sequences in the OEIS:
 Sequences related to factorial base representation
 Factorial numbers:  and 
 Inversion numbers: 
 Inversion sets of finite permutations interpreted as binary numbers:   
 Finite permutations that have only 0s and 1s in their inversion vectors:   
 Number of permutations of n elements with k inversions; Mahonian numbers:    (their row maxima;)
 Number of connected labeled graphs with n edges and n nodes:

References

Source bibliography

Further reading

Presortedness measures 

 
 

Permutations
Order theory
String metrics
Sorting algorithms
Combinatorics
Discrete mathematics